Entomoplasma freundtii is a mollicute bacteria species that can be isolated from the green tiger beetle (Cicindela campestris, Coleoptera: Cicindelidae).

References

External links 

 bacterio.net

Mollicutes
Bacteria described in 1998